Stieng (also spelled Xtieng or Xtiêng) may refer to:
 The Stieng people, an ethnic minority of Cambodia and Vietnam
Stieng language, the Austro-Asiatic language of the Stieng people